The Career Intelligence Medal is awarded by the Central Intelligence Agency for a cumulative record of service which reflects exceptional achievements that substantially contributed to the mission of the Agency.

See also 
Awards and decorations of the United States government

References

Awards and decorations of the Central Intelligence Agency